The Truth may refer to:

Film
 The Truth (1920 film) starring Madge Kennedy
 The Truth (1960 film) or La Vérité, a French film by Henri-Georges Clouzot starring Brigitte Bardot
 The Truth (1988 film), a Hong Kong trial crime drama film by Taylor Wong
 The Truth (1998 film), an Indian Malayalam film by Shaji Kailas
 The Truth (2006 film), a British dark comic murder mystery
 The Truth (2012 film) or A Dark Truth, an American action thriller film by Damian Lee
 The Truth (2019 film), or La Vérité, a French-English drama film by Hirokazu Kore-eda

Literature
 The Truth (novel), a 2000 Discworld novel by Terry Pratchett
 The Truth (with Jokes), a 2005 book by Al Franken
 The Truth: An Uncomfortable Book About Relationships, a 2015 book by Neil Strauss
 The Truth, a 2012 novel by Michael Palin
 Pauline Hanson: The Truth, a 1997 book by Australian politician Pauline Hanson

Music

Artists
 The Truth (Australian band)
 The Truth (British band)
 The Truth (British rapper)
 Da' T.R.U.T.H. (born 1977), Christian rapper
 The Truth, a British vocal duo who released a version of The Beatles' "Girl" in 1966

Albums
 The Truth (Bleeding Through album) (2006)
 The Truth (Cherish album) (2008)
 The Truth (Aaron Hall album) (1993)
 The Truth (Ledisi album) (2014)
 The Truth (Prince album) (1997)
 The Truth (Brady Seals album) (1997)
 The Truth (Beanie Sigel album) (2000)
 The Truth (Spice 1 album) (2005)
 The Truth (TRU album) (2005)
 The Truth (Young Sid album) (2007)
 The Truth, an album by Basic Element (2008)
 The Truth, an album by Ben Granfelt Band
 The Truth, an album by Consolation
 The-Truth!!!, an album by Tommy Turk

Songs
 "The Truth" (Jason Aldean song) (2009)
 "The Truth" (Kris Allen song) (2009)
 "The Truth" (Prince song) (1997)
 "The Truth" (Relient K song) (2005)
 "The Truth", by Gregg Alexander from Intoxifornication
 "The Truth",  by Beanie Sigel from The Truth
 "The Truth",  by India Arie
 "The Truth", by Clawfinger from Deaf Dumb Blind
 "The Truth", by Cosmic Gate from No More Sleep
 "The Truth", by DC Talk from Supernatural
 "The Truth", by DJ Kay Slay from The Streetsweeper, Vol. 2
 "The Truth", by Foster the People from Supermodel
 "The Truth", by Good Charlotte from The Chronicles of Life and Death
 "The Truth", by Handsome Boy Modeling School from So... How's Your Girl?
 "The Truth", by James Blunt from Once Upon a Mind
 "The Truth", by Limp Bizkit from The Unquestionable Truth (Part 1)
 "The Truth", by Mýa
 "The Truth", by Pnau
 "The Truth", by Sentenced from Shadows of the Past
 "The Truth", by Seventh Wonder from Tiara
 "The Truth", by Toya from Toya
 "The Truth", by While She Sleeps from The North Stands for Nothing

People
 Paul Darden or the Truth (born 1968), professional poker player
 Ron Killings or the Truth (born 1972), professional wrestler
 Paul Pierce or the Truth (born 1977), NBA forward
 Brandon Vera or the Truth (born 1977), mixed martial artist
 Carl Williams (boxer) or the Truth (1959–2013), American boxer

Television
 The Truth (2008 TV series), a Singaporean Chinese modern suspense drama
 The Truth (2011 TV series) or The Other Truth, a Hong Kong legal drama series
 "The Truth" (The O.C.), a 2004 episode of The O.C.
 "The Truth" (Seinfeld), a 1991 episode of Seinfeld
 "The Truth" (The X-Files), an episode of The X-Files

Other uses 
 The Truth (character), a character in Grand Theft Auto: San Andreas
 The Truth (play), a 1906 or 1907 play by Clyde Fitch
 The Truth (podcast), a storytelling podcast
 TheTruth.com, a website for the anti-smoking organization called Truth
 The Truth, a name used among its members for the Two by Twos church
 The Elkhart Truth, a newspaper

See also
 Truth (disambiguation)